Monochroa absconditella is a moth of the family Gelechiidae. It was described by Francis Walker in 1864. It is found in North America, where it has been recorded from Florida, Illinois, Maine, Mississippi, New Hampshire and Ohio.

The wingspan is about 12.7 mm. Adults are on wing from January to February and from April to December.

The larvae feed in the stem of Ampelopsis and Polygonum species (including Polygonum densilflorum and Polygonum punctatum).

References

Moths described in 1864
Monochroa